Serovera is a nutritional supplement marketed by TeamTrade, Inc., Serovera products were formulated to support immune and digestive health. It is sold at retailers as well as through direct internet marketing.

Currently sold in the United States with the stabilized and isolated agent aloe mucilaginous polysaccharide, Like many nutraceuticals, its efficacy is questionable.

Serovera promotes itself as being created by Dr. Ivan Danhof. Various other doctors have contributed and written articles regarding the uses of aloe mucilaginous polysaccharides; Lawrence Plaskett, John C. Pittman, Jeffrey Bland, Julian J. Blitz, James W. Smith and Bruce Eric Hedendal, that support evidence suggesting consumption  of aloe polysaccharides may have a beneficial effect on the body.

References

External links
Official Website
Suplemen Kesehatan

Dietary supplements